Lulworthiomycetidae is a subclass of Sordariomycetes.

Orders
As accepted by Wijayawardene et al. 2020;
 Koralionastetales  (1 family)
 Koralionastetaceae (2 genera Koralionastes  and Pontogeneia )
 
 Lulworthiales 
 Lulworthiaceae  (16 genera)
 Cumulospora  (2)
 Halazoon  (2)
 Haloguignardia  (1)
 Hydea  (1)
 Kohlmeyeriella  (2)
 Lindra  (2)
 Lulwoana  (6)
 Lulwoidea  (1)
 Lulworthia  (32)
 Matsusporium  (1)
 Moleospora  (1)
 Moromyces  (1)
 Orbimyces  (1)
 Paralulworthia  (3)
 Rostrupiella  (1)
 Sammeyersia  (1)

References

Sordariomycetes
Fungus subclasses
fungus taxa
Taxa described in 1997